The 1966 Delaware State Hornets football team represented Delaware State College—now known as Delaware State University—as a member of the Central Intercollegiate Athletic Association (CIAA) in the 1966 NCAA College Division football season. Led by second-year head coach Ulysses S. Washington, the Hornets compiled an overall record of 3–5 and a mark of 2–4 in conference play, placing 14th in CIAA.

Schedule

References

Delaware State
Delaware State Hornets football seasons
Delaware State Hornets football